Family Secrets is a 2001 period film starring Angela Jones and written and directed by Sally Champlin.

Overview
A young boy retreats into an endless cycle of sadness following his grandmother's death.  His parents hire a live-in tutor in a final bid to save their son.

References

External links

2001 films
American drama films
2001 drama films
2000s American films